Amniscus similis is a species of longhorn beetles of the subfamily Lamiinae. It was described by Gahan in 1895, and is known from Lesser Antilles and Barbados in the West Indies, and Puerto Rico.

References

Beetles described in 1895
Acanthocinini